Ha Nam (born 7 December 1998) is a Korean footballer currently playing as a forward for Gyeongnam FC.

Career statistics

Club

References

1998 births
Living people
South Korean footballers
Association football forwards
K League 2 players
FC Anyang players
Gyeongnam FC players